The 167th New York State Legislature, consisting of the New York State Senate and the New York State Assembly, met from January 5, 1949, to March 22, 1950, during the seventh and eighth years of Thomas E. Dewey's governorship, in Albany.

Background
Under the provisions of the New York Constitution of 1938, re-apportioned in 1943, 56 Senators and 150 assemblymen were elected in single-seat districts for two-year terms. The senatorial districts consisted either of one or more entire counties; or a contiguous area within a single county. The counties which were divided into more than one senatorial district were Kings (nine districts), New York (six), Bronx (five), Queens (four), Erie (three), Westchester (three), Monroe (two) and Nassau (two). The Assembly districts consisted either of a single entire county (except Hamilton Co.), or of contiguous area within one county.

At this time there were two major political parties: the Republican Party and the Democratic Party. The Liberal Party and the American Labor Party also nominated tickets.

Elections
The New York state election, 1948, was held on November 2. No statewide elective offices were up for election.

Seven of the eight women members of the previous legislature—Assemblywomen Gladys E. Banks (Rep.), of the Bronx; Mary A. Gillen (Dem.), of Brooklyn; Janet Hill Gordon (Rep.), a lawyer of Norwich; Elizabeth Hanniford (Rep.), a statistician of the Bronx; Genesta M. Strong (Rep.), of Plandome Heights; Mildred F. Taylor (Rep.), a coal dealer of Lyons; and Maude E. Ten Eyck (Rep.), of Manhattan—were re-elected.

The New York state election, 1949, was held on November 8. Both statewide elective offices up for election were carried by the Democratic/Liberal nominees. The approximate party strength at this election, as expressed by the vote for U.S. Senator, was: Republicans 2,378,000; Democrats 2,149,000; and Liberals 426,000. Two vacancies in the State Senate, and two vacancies in the Assembly were filled.

Sessions
The Legislature met for the first regular session (the 172nd) at the State Capitol in Albany on January 5, 1949; and adjourned in the morning of March 31.

Oswald D. Heck (Rep.) was re-elected Speaker.

Benjamin F. Feinberg (Rep.) was re-elected Temporary President of the State Senate. On March 30, 1949, Feinberg was appointed as Chairman of the New York Public Service Commission, and Arthur H. Wicks (Rep.) was elected Temporary President of the State Senate.

The Legislature met for the second regular session (the 173rd) at the State Capitol in Albany on January 4, 1950; and adjourned on March 22.

State Senate

Districts

Senators
The asterisk (*) denotes members of the previous Legislature who continued in office as members of this Legislature. Harry Gittleson and Louis Bennett changed from the Assembly to the Senate at the beginning of this Legislature. Assemblyman Henry Neddo was elected to fill a vacancy in the Senate.

Note: For brevity, the chairmanships omit the words "...the Committee on (the)..."

Employees
 Clerk (1949), office renamed Secretary (1950): William S. King

State Assembly

Assemblymen

Note: For brevity, the chairmanships omit the words "...the Committee on (the)..."

Employees
 Clerk: Ansley B. Borkowski
 Sergeant-at-Arms: Joseph C. Williams

Notes

Sources
 Your Representatives in Merit (Winter 1948, Vol. 17, No. 4, pg. 118f)
 Members of the New York Senate (1940s) at Political Graveyard
 Members of the New York Assembly (1940s) at Political Graveyard

167
1949 in New York (state)
1950 in New York (state)
1949 U.S. legislative sessions
1950 U.S. legislative sessions